Kimble is a cloud-based PSA software application, also known as Kimble PSA.

History
Kimble Applications Limited was founded in 2010 by Sean Hoban, Mark Robinson, and David Scott. The company is headquartered in London, England with other offices in the United States including Boston, Park City, Chicago, and Atlanta.

In 2018, Kimble secured investment from Accel-KKR, a technology-focused investment firm based in Silicon Valley.

In 2021 Kimble merged with Mavenlink, another cloud based PSA software vendor. 

In 2022, Kimble and Mavenlink became Kantata.

Services
Kimble provides a professional services automation (PSA) solution known as Kimble PSA which is built on the Salesforce platform and recognized by Salesforce as a premier partner. The Kimble app automates pipeline forecasting, resource planning, delivery management and project accounting.

See also
 Automation
 Professional services automation
 Comparison of PSA systems
 Salesforce.com

References

Automation software
Cloud applications